The 1962 Houston Colt .45s were an expansion team in American Major League Baseball's National League, and 1962 was the first season in franchise history. Harry Craft was Houston's first manager. The .45s finished eighth among the National League's ten teams with a record of 64–96, 36½ games behind the league champion San Francisco Giants.

Offseason 
 September 11, 1961: Rusty Staub was signed as an amateur free agent by the Colt .45's.
 October 13, 1961: Al Cicotte was purchased by the Colt .45s from the St. Louis Cardinals.
 March 24, 1962: Dave Philley was signed as a free agent by the Colt .45s.
 March 24, 1962: Dave Philley was traded by the Colt .45s to the Boston Red Sox for Tom Borland.
 Prior to 1962 season: J. C. Hartman was acquired by the Colt .45s from the Houston Buffaloes as part of a minor league working agreement.

Expansion draft 

The Colt .45s were one of two teams added to the National League before the 1962 season, the other being the New York Mets. This brought the number of teams in the NL to ten, matching the 1961 expansion of the American League.

Regular phase 

$75,000 per player

 Eddie Bressoud, infielder, San Francisco Giants
 Bob Aspromonte, infielder, Los Angeles Dodgers
 Bob Lillis, infielder, St. Louis Cardinals
 Dick Drott, pitcher, Chicago Cubs
 Al Heist, outfielder, Chicago Cubs
 Román Mejías, outfielder, Pittsburgh Pirates
 George Williams, infielder, Philadelphia Phillies
 Jesse Hickman, pitcher, Philadelphia Phillies
 Merritt Ranew, catcher, Milwaukee Braves
 Don Taussig, outfielder, St. Louis Cardinals
 Bobby Shantz, pitcher, Pittsburgh Pirates
 Norm Larker, infielder, Los Angeles Dodgers
 Sam Jones, pitcher, San Francisco Giants
 Paul Roof, pitcher, Milwaukee Braves
 Ken Johnson, pitcher, Cincinnati Reds
 Dick Gernert, infielder, Cincinnati Reds
 Ed Olivares, infielder, St. Louis Cardinals
 Jim Umbricht, pitcher, Pittsburgh Pirates
 Jim Golden, pitcher, Los Angeles Dodgers

Premium phase 
$125,000 per player

 Joey Amalfitano, infielder, San Francisco Giants
 Turk Farrell, pitcher, Los Angeles Dodgers
 Hal Smith, catcher, Pittsburgh Pirates
 Al Spangler, outfielder, Milwaukee Braves

1961 minor league affiliates
The Colt .45s and Mets were established on October 17, 1960, giving them time to acquire professional minor-league players, sign amateur free agents (there was no MLB first-year player draft until 1965) and enter into working agreements with minor league affiliates during the 1961 season. Houston had formal working agreements with two minor league baseball teams in 1961:

The first game
April 10, Colt Stadium, Houston, Texas

Opening Day lineup

Regular season 
The Colt .45s started their inaugural season on April 10, 1962, with an 11–2 win against the Chicago Cubs, highlighted by a three-run home run in the bottom of the third inning by Román Mejías.  The .45s would go on to sweep the Cubs in their first three-game series at Colt Stadium. The team finished April with a 7–8 record, 4 games in front of the expansion Mets and only 5 games behind the National League leading Pirates and Giants.

By June 2, with the second loss to the Pirates in Pittsburgh, the Colt .45s had fallen to 16 games behind the eventual National League Champion Giants, a deficit that no pre-wild card team had recovered from to make the post season.  And, with an August 21 loss at the hands of the Phillies, the Houston Colt .45s were mathematically eliminated from the postseason with a 37-game deficit to the Dodgers with 37 games left.

To get an idea of how the first season was for Houston, look at the team's best pitcher, Richard "Turk" Farrell. A starter for the Colt .45s, he was primarily a relief pitcher when he was with the Los Angeles Dodgers and Philadelphia Phillies. Turk lost 20 games in 1962, but had an ERA of 3.02. Turk was selected to both All-Star games that year.

There was a bright spot in the line up in 1962. Román Mejías, who was acquired from the Pittsburgh Pirates in the expansion draft, was named the Colt .45s starting right fielder. It was in Houston that Mejías would play the best season of his career.  While he played better the first half of the season, an injury slowed him the second half of the season. However, he still finished with a .286 batting average, 24 home runs, and 76 RBIs. His modesty and his hard play made him a fan favorite that year. Despite his good year, Mejías was traded to the Boston Red Sox in the fall of 1962.

Season standings

Record vs. opponents

Notable transactions 
 May 7, 1962: Bobby Shantz was traded by the Colt .45s to the St. Louis Cardinals for John Anderson and Carl Warwick.
 June 26, 1962: Bob Cerv was purchased by the Colt .45s from the New York Yankees.
 July 30, 1962: Bob Cerv was released by the Colt .45s.

Roster

Game log 

|- align="center" bgcolor="bbffbb"
| 1 || April 10 || Cubs || 11–2 || Shantz (1–0) || Cardwell (0–1) || – || 25,271 || 1–0
|- align="center" bgcolor="bbffbb"
| 2 || April 11 || Cubs || 2–0 || Woodeshick (1–0) || Hobbie (0–1) || Farrell (1) || 20,336 || 2–0
|- align="center" bgcolor="bbffbb"
| 3 || April 12 || Cubs || 2–0 || Stone (1–0) || Curtis (0–1) || – || 7,838 || 3–0
|- align="center" bgcolor="ffbbbb"
| 4 || April 13 || @ Phillies || 2–3 || Hamilton (1–0) || Farrell (0–1) || – || 12,633 || 3–1
|- align="center" bgcolor="ffbbbb"
| 5 || April 14 || @ Phillies || 0–3 || Mahaffey (2–0) || Johnson (0–1) || – || 2,732 || 3–2
|- align="center" bgcolor="bbffbb"
| 6 || April 17 || @ Mets || 5–2 (11) || Golden (1–0) || Moford (0–1) || Tiefenauer (1) || 3,191 || 4–2
|- align="center" bgcolor="ffbbbb"
| 7 || April 18 || @ Cubs || 2–3 (10) || Ellsworth (1–0) || Farrell (0–2) || – || 3,318 || 4–3
|- align="center" bgcolor="bbffbb"
| 8 || April 19 || @ Cubs || 6–0 || Stone (2–0) || Cardwell (0–3) || – || 3,835 || 5–3
|- align="center" bgcolor="ffbbbb"
| 9 || April 21 || Phillies || 1–3 || McLish (1–0) || Johnson (0–2) || Baldschun (1) || 21,841 || 5–4
|- align="center" bgcolor="ffbbbb"
| 10 || April 22 || Phillies || 3–4 || Owens (1–1) || Giusti (0–1) || Baldschun (2) || 13,130 || 5–5
|- align="center" bgcolor="bbffbb"
| 11 || April 24 || Cardinals || 4–3 || Woodeshick (2–0) || Jackson (2–1) || – || 19,335 || 6–5
|- align="center" bgcolor="white"
| 12 || April 25 || Cardinals || 5–5 (17) || – || – || – || 17,265 || 6–5
|- align="center" bgcolor="ffbbbb"
| 13 || April 26 || Cardinals || 2–3 || Gibson (1–1) || Johnson (0–3) || – || 15,129 || 6–6
|- align="center" bgcolor="ffbbbb"
| 14 || April 27 || Braves || 1–2 || Shaw (2–1) || Shantz (1–1) || – || 16,160 || 6–7
|- align="center" bgcolor="ffbbbb"
| 15 || April 28 || Braves || 3–9 || Butler (1–0) || Giusti (0–2) || – || 22,501 || 6–8
|- align="center" bgcolor="bbffbb"
| 16 || April 29 || Braves || 3–2 || Farrell (1–2) || McMahon (0–1) || – || 21,050 || 7–8
|-

|- align="center" bgcolor="ffbbbb"
| 17 || May 1 || @ Cardinals || 4–6 || Washburn (2–0) || Stone (2–1) || Bauta (1) || 4,924 || 7–9
|- align="center" bgcolor="ffbbbb"
| 18 || May 2 || @ Cardinals || 1–4 || Gibson (2–1) || Johnson (0–4) || – || 7,880 || 7–10
|- align="center" bgcolor="ffbbbb"
| 19 || May 3 || @ Cardinals || 0–4 || Simmons (4–0) || Giusti (0–3) || – || 6,436 || 7–11
|- align="center" bgcolor="bbffbb"
| 20 || May 4 || @ Braves || 7–4 || Bruce (1–0) || Hendley (2–2) || Farrell (2) || 7,811 || 8–11
|- align="center" bgcolor="ffbbbb"
| 21 || May 5 || @ Braves || 5–6 (12) || Curtis (1–2) || Woodeschick (2–1) || – || 4,920 || 8–12
|- align="center" bgcolor="ffbbbb"
| 22 || May 6 || @ Braves || 2–3 || Spahn (3–3) || Golden (1–1) || – || 12,635 || 8–13
|- align="center" bgcolor="bbffbb"
| 23 || May 6 || @ Braves || 9–1 || Farrell (2–2) || Willey (0–2) || – || 12,635 || 9–13
|- align="center" bgcolor="bbffbb"
| 24 || May 7 || Dodgers || 9–6 || Tiefenauer (1–0) || Richert (1–1) || – || 19,170 || 10–13
|- align="center" bgcolor="ffbbbb"
| 25 || May 8 || Dodgers || 6–9 (10) || Perranoski (2–0) || Tiefenauer (1–1) || Roebuck (1) || 17,483 || 10–14
|- align="center" bgcolor="ffbbbb"
| 26 || May 9 || Dodgers || 2–9 || Podres (2–2) || Richert (1–1) || – || 12,684 || 10–15
|- align="center" bgcolor="ffbbbb"
| 27 || May 10 || Dodgers || 2–6 || Drysdale (5–1) || Bruce (1–1) || – || 15,076 || 10–16
|- align="center" bgcolor="bbffbb"
| 28 || May 11 || Giants || 7–0 || Farrell (3–2) || Perry (2–1) || – || 19,003|| 11–16
|- align="center" bgcolor="ffbbbb"
| 29 || May 12 || Giants || 0–11 || Marichal (6–2) || Woodeshick (2–2) || – || 26,311|| 11–17
|- align="center" bgcolor="ffbbbb"
| 30 || May 13 || Giants || 2–7 || Sanford (4–2) || Johnson (0–5) || – || 19,879|| 11–18
|- align="center" bgcolor="ffbbbb"
| 31 || May 15 || @ Dodgers || 7–10 || Perranoski (3–0) || Tiefenauer (1–2) || – || 18,675|| 11–19
|- align="center" bgcolor="ffbbbb"
| 32 || May 16 || @ Dodgers || 2–5 || Moeller (2–3) || Farrell (3–3) || Roebuck (3) || 16,075|| 11–20
|- align="center" bgcolor="ffbbbb"
| 33 || May 17 || @ Dodgers || 4–2 (10) || Roebuck (2–0) || Tiefenauer (1–2) || – || 17,639|| 11–21
|- align="center" bgcolor="bbffbb"
| 34 || May 18 || @ Giants || 3–2 (10) || Johnson (1–5) || Sanford (4–3) || – || 18,544|| 12–21
|- align="center" bgcolor="ffbbbb"
| 35 || May 19 || @ Giants || 2–10 || McCormick (1–1) || Witt (0–1) || Larson (3) || 16,701 || 12–22
|- align="center" bgcolor="bbffbb"
| 36 || May 20 || @ Giants || 6–5 || Bruce (2–1) || Marichal (7–3) || Farrell (3) || 40,932 || 13–22
|- align="center" bgcolor="ffbbbb"
| 37 || May 20 || @ Giants || 4–7 || Pierce (6–0) || Woodeshick (2–3) || – || 40,932 || 13–23
|- align="center" bgcolor="bbffbb"
| 38 || May 21 || Mets || 3–2 || Golden (2–1) || Mizell (1–2) || – || 16,317 || 14–23
|- align="center" bgcolor="bbffbb"
| 39 || May 22 || Mets || 3–2 || Farrell (4–3) || Hook (3–3) || – || 11,980 || 15–23
|- align="center" bgcolor="bbffbb"
| 40 || May 23 || Reds || 2–0 || Johnson (2–5) || Purkey (7–1) || – || 9,266 || 16–23
|- align="center" bgcolor="ffbbbb"
| 41 || May 24 || Reds || 0–5 || Jay (6–4) || Witt (0–2) || – || 8,570 || 16–24
|- align="center" bgcolor="ffbbbb"
| 42 || May 25 || Pirates || 3–4 (13) || Face (2–1) || Tiefenauer (1–4) || Sturdivant (1) || 11,350 || 16–25
|- align="center" bgcolor="bbffbb"
| 43 || May 26 || Pirates || 2–0 || Golden (3–1) || Friend (4–6) || – || 13,909|| 17–25
|- align="center" bgcolor="ffbbbb"
| 44 || May 27 || Pirates || 2–7 || Law (2–1) || Johnson (2–6) || – || 11,793|| 17–26
|- align="center" bgcolor="ffbbbb"
| 45 || May 28 || @ Reds || 6–9 || Jay (7–4) || Farrell (4–4) || – || 8,979|| 17–27
|- align="center" bgcolor="bbffbb"
| 46 || May 30 || @ Cubs || 8–6 (14) || Giusti (1–3) || Schultz (3–2) || – || 17,842|| 18–27
|- align="center" bgcolor="bbffbb"
| 47 || May 30 || @ Cubs || 10–6 || McMahon (1–1) || Elston (2–2) || – || 3,722|| 19–27
|-

|- align="center" bgcolor="ffbbbb"
| 48 || June 1 || @ Pirates || 4–8 || Face (3–1)  || Golden (3–2) || – || 14,961|| 19–28
|- align="center" bgcolor="ffbbbb"
| 49 || June 2 || @ Pirates || 2–9 || Law (3–1)  || Farrell (4–5) || – ||  11,703 || 19–29
|- align="center" bgcolor="bbffbb"
| 50 || June 3 || @ Pirates || 10–6 || Tiefenauer (2–4) || Sturdivant (3–3) || McMahon (1) || 24,282 || 20–29
|- align="center" bgcolor="bbffbb"
| 51 || June 3 || @ Pirates || 10–3 || Johnson (3–6) || McBean (5–2) || – || 24,282 || 21–29
|- align="center" bgcolor="bbffbb"
| 52 || June 5 ||  Braves || 7–1 || Bruce (3–1) || Piche (3–1) || – || 11,593 || 22–29
|- align="center" bgcolor="ffbbbb"
| 53 || June 6 ||  Braves || 3–6 || Burdette (3–4) || Golden (3–3) || – || 11,569 || 22–30
|- align="center" bgcolor="bbffbb"
| 54 || June 7 ||  Braves || 3–2 || McMahon (2–1) || Spahn (6–6) || – || 14,818 || 23–30
|- align="center" bgcolor="ffbbbb"
| 55 || June 8 || Dodgers || 3–4 (13) || L. Sherry (4–2) || McMahon (2–2) || – || 15,877 || 23–31
|- align="center" bgcolor="bbffbb"
| 56 || June 9 || Dodgers || 13–1 || Bruce (4–1) || Williams (6–2) || – || 11,908 || 24–31
|- align="center" bgcolor="ffbbbb"
| 57 || June 10 || Dodgers || 3–9 || Drysdale (10–3) || Golden (3–4) || – || 30,027 || 24–32
|- align="center" bgcolor="ffbbbb"
| 58 || June 10 || Dodgers || 7–9 || Moeller (5–4) || Woodeshick (2–4) || Perranoski (7) || 30,027 || 24–33
|- align="center" bgcolor="ffbbbb"
| 59 || June 11 || Mets || 1–3 || Jackson (3–7) || Farrell (4–6) || – || 8,920 || 24–34
|- align="center" bgcolor="bbffbb"
| 60 || June 12 || Mets || 3–2 || Johnson (4–6) || Anderson (3–6) || – || 7,344 || 25–34
|- align="center" bgcolor="bbffbb"
| 61 || June 14 || Mets || 10–2 || Bruce (5–1) || Hook (4–7) || – || 10,761 || 26–34
|- align="center" bgcolor="bbffbb"
| 62 || June 15 || @ Dodgers || 2–0 || Golden (4–4) || Drysdale (10–4) || – || 22,709 || 27–34
|- align="center" bgcolor="bbffbb"
| 63 || June 16 || @ Dodgers || 4–1 || Farrell (5–6) || Podres (3–6) || – || 51,530 || 28–34
|- align="center" bgcolor="ffbbbb"
| 64 || June 17 || @ Dodgers || 2–6 || Roebuck (4–0) ||Johnson (4–7) || L. Sherry (5) || 47,397 || 28–35
|- align="center" bgcolor="bbffbb"
| 65 || June 19 || @ Giants || 6–4 || Giusti (2–3) || O'Dell (7–6) || Farrell (4) || 18,749 || 29–35
|- align="center" bgcolor="bbffbb"
| 66 || June 20 || @ Giants || 9–5 || Stone (3–2) || Miller (3–2) || McMahon (2) || 10,430 || 30–35
|- align="center" bgcolor="ffbbbb"
| 67 || June 22 || @ Mets || 0–2 || Jackson (4–8) || Farrell (5–7) || – || 11,484 || 30–36
|- align="center" bgcolor="bbffbb"
| 68 || June 22 || @ Mets || 16–3 || Golden (5–4) || B. Miller (0–5) || – || 11,484 || 31–36
|- align="center" bgcolor="ffbbbb"
| 69 || June 23 || @ Mets || 2–13 || Hook (5–8) || Johnson (4–8) || – || 6,425 || 31–37
|- align="center" bgcolor="ffbbbb"
| 70 || June 25 || @ Phillies || 3–4 || Green (2–2) || Woodeshick (2–5) || – || 8,087 || 31–38
|- align="center" bgcolor="ffbbbb"
| 71 || June 26 || @ Phillies || 0–2 || Hamilton (5–5) || Farrell (5–8) || – || 18,707 || 31–39
|- align="center" bgcolor="ffbbbb"
| 72 || June 26 || @ Phillies || 4–6 || Mahaffey (9–8) || Golden (5–5) || – || 18,707 || 31–40
|- align="center" bgcolor="ffbbbb"
| 73 || June 29 || Reds || 0–4 || O'Toole (6–9) || Johnson (4–9) || – || 7,612 || 31–41
|- align="center" bgcolor="bbffbb"
| 74 || June 30 || Reds || 7–3 (7) || Bruce (6–1) || Maloney (2–3) || – || 9,758 || 32–41
|-

|- align="center" bgcolor="ffbbbb"
| 75 || July 1 || Reds || 1–6 || Jay (11–7) || Golden (5–6) || – || 6,666 || 32–42
|- align="center" bgcolor="ffbbbb"
| 76 || July 2 || Pirates || 2–4 || Friend (8–8) || Woodeshick (2–6) || Face (14) || 11,760 || 32–43
|- align="center" bgcolor="ffbbbb"
| 77 || July 3 || Pirates || 2–5 || Haddix (7–3) || Johnson (4–10) || Face (15) || 10,729 || 32–44
|- align="center" bgcolor="ffbbbb"
| 78 || July 4 || Pirates || 0–7 || Law (7–3) || Bruce (6–2) || – || 20,005 || 32–45
|- align="center" bgcolor="ffbbbb"
| 79 || July 4 || Pirates || 3–4 || Francis (5–5) || Golden (5–7) || Face (16) || 20,005 || 32–46
|- align="center" bgcolor="bbffbb"
| 80 || July 6 || @ Reds || 2–0 || Woodeshick (3–6) || Jay (11–8) || – || 15,871 || 33–46
|- align="center" bgcolor="ffbbbb"
| 81 || July 7 || @ Reds || 1–10 || Purkey (14–2) || Johnson (4–11) || – || 6,936 || 33–47
|- align="center" bgcolor="ffbbbb"
| 82 || July 8 || @ Reds || 8–12 || Maloney (4–3) || Farrell (5–9) || – || 18,332 || 33–48
|- align="center" bgcolor="ffbbbb"
| 83 || July 8 || @ Reds || 11–12 (13) || O'Toole (8–9) || Farrell (5–10) || – || 18,332 || 33–49
|- align="center" bgcolor="ffbbbb"
| 84 || July 11 || @ Phillies || 1–6 || Mahaffey (11–9) || Woodeshick (3–7) || – || 3,441 || 33–50
|- align="center" bgcolor="ffbbbb"
| 85 || July 12 || @ Pirates || 4–6 || McBean (9–5) || Golden (5–8) || – || 14,784 || 33–51
|- align="center" bgcolor="ffbbbb"
| 86 || July 13 || @ Pirates || 0–4 || Friend (9–9) || Farrell (5–11) || – || 15,376 || 33–52
|- align="center" bgcolor="ffbbbb"
| 87 || July 14 || @ Pirates || 2–4 || Law (8–4) || Bruce (6–3) ||- || 7,343 || 33–53
|- align="center" bgcolor="bbffbb"
| 88 || July 15 || Cubs || 5–4 || Woodeshick (4–7) || Buhl (6–7) || McMahon (3) || 6,907 || 34–53
|- align="center" bgcolor="ffbbbb"
| 89 || July 15 || Cubs || 1–4 || Ellsworth (5–13) || Johnson (4–12) || – || 6,907 || 34–54
|- align="center" bgcolor="ffbbbb"
| 90 || July 17 || Phillies || 0–3 || Hamilton (6–7) || Kemmerer (0–1) || Baldschun (9) || 8,115 || 34–55
|- align="center" bgcolor="ffbbbb"
| 91 || July 17 || Phillies || 2–8 || McLish (6–2) || Farrell (5–12) || Bennett (1) || 8,115 || 34–56
|- align="center" bgcolor="ffbbbb"
| 92 || July 18 || Phillies || 2–6 || Green (3–2) || Bruce (6–4) || – || 5,140 || 34–57
|- align="center" bgcolor="ffbbbb"
| 93 || July 19 || Phillies || 2–6 || Short (5–6) || Woodeshick (4–8) || Baldschun (10) || 5,017 || 34–58
|- align="center" bgcolor="bbffbb"
| 94 || July 20 || Cardinals || 4–3 || Farrell (6–12) || McDaniel (2–5) || – || 15,422 || 35–58
|- align="center" bgcolor="ffbbbb"
| 95 || July 21 || Cardinals || 0–7 || Jackson (9–8) || Kemmerer (0–2) || – || 17,742 || 35–59
|- align="center" bgcolor="bbffbb"
| 96 || July 21 || Cardinals || 7–3 || Johnson (5–12) || Simmons (8–6) || Golden (1) || 17,742 || 36–59
|- align="center" bgcolor="ffbbbb"
| 97 || July 22 || Cardinals || 1–3 || Gibson (13–6) || Bruce (6–5) || McDaniel (11) || 8,685 || 36–60
|- align="center" bgcolor="ffbbbb"
| 98 || July 23 || Giants || 1–5 || Bolin (6–0) || Woodeshick (4–9) || – || 12,096 || 36–61
|- align="center" bgcolor="ffbbbb"
| 99 || July 24 || Giants || 1–3 || Sanford (13–6) || Farrell (6–13) || Larsen (6) || 11,289 || 36–62
|- align="center" bgcolor="ffbbbb"
| 100 || July 25 || Giants || 2–3 || O'Dell (12–8) || Golden (5–9) || Miller (14) || 12,344 || 36–63
|- align="center" bgcolor="ffbbbb"
| 101 || July 27 || @ Cubs || 1–5 || Ellsworth (6–14) || Woodeshick (4–10) || – || 6,111 || 36–64
|- align="center" bgcolor="ffbbbb"
| 102 || July 29 || @ Cubs || 2–4 || Koonce (9–3) || Golden (5–10) || Cardwell (2) || 10,334 || 36–65
|- align="center" bgcolor="bbffbb"
| 103 || July 29 || @ Cubs || 3–1 || Farrell (7–13) || Hobbie (3–10) || – || 10,334 || 37–65
|-

|- align="center" bgcolor="ffbbbb"
| 104 || August 1 || @ Braves || 0–3 || Shaw (12–8) || Woodeshick (4–11) || – || 10,829 || 37–66
|- align="center" bgcolor="bbffbb"
| 105 || August 2 || @ Braves || 3–0 || Farrell (8–13) || Burdette (8–7) || – || 8.338 || 38–66
|- align="center" bgcolor="bbffbb"
| 106 || August 3 || @ Cardinals || 8–3 || Johnson (6–12) || Gibson (13–8) || McMahon (4) || 11,853 || 39–66
|- align="center" bgcolor="ffbbbb"
| 107 || August 4 || @ Cardinals || 0–2 || Washburn (10–5) || Bruce (6–6) || – || 9,390 || 39–67
|- align="center" bgcolor="bbffbb"
| 108 || August 5 || @ Cardinals || 7–4 || Kemmerer (1–2) || McDaniel (2–6) || McMahon (5) || 14,954 || 40–67
|- align="center" bgcolor="ffbbbb"
| 109 || August 5 || @ Cardinals || 4–7 || Toth (1–0) || Woodeshick (4–12) || – || 14,954 || 40–68
|- align="center" bgcolor="ffbbbb"
| 110 || August 6 || Reds || 0–1 (13) || Klippstein (4–2) || McMahon (2–3) || – || 8,507 || 40–69
|- align="center" bgcolor="ffbbbb"
| 111 || August 7 || Reds || 0–3 || Jay (17–9) || Johnson (6–13) || – || 6,523 || 40–70
|- align="center" bgcolor="ffbbbb"
| 112 || August 8 || Reds || 0–4 || Nuxhall (2–0) || Bruce (6–7) || Brosnan (8) || 7,350 || 40–71
|- align="center" bgcolor="ffbbbb"
| 113 || August 9 || Reds || 3–7 || O'Toole (12–12) || Woodeshick (4–13) || – || 5,196 || 40–72
|- align="center" bgcolor="ffbbbb"
| 114 || August 10 || Braves || 6–7 || Spahn (12–11) || Brunet (0–1) || Raymond (5) || 7,047 || 40–73
|- align="center" bgcolor="ffbbbb"
| 115 || August 11 || Braves || 1–3 || Shaw (14–8) || Farrell (8–14) || Raymond (6) || 14,630 || 40–74
|- align="center" bgcolor="bbffbb"
| 116 || August 12 || Braves || 8–5 || Bruce (7–7) || Burdette (9–8) || Kemmerer (1) || 4,902 || 41–74
|- align="center" bgcolor="bbffbb"
| 117 || August 14 || Cardinals || 4–3 (10) || McMahon (3–3) || Gibson (14–9) || – || 9,604 || 42–74
|- align="center" bgcolor="bbffbb"
| 118 || August 15 || Cardinals || 3–1 || Woodeshick (5–13) || Washburn (10–6) || Kemmerer (2) || 8,843 || 43–74
|- align="center" bgcolor="ffbbbb"
| 119 || August 16 || Cardinals || 1–3 || Jackson (10–10) || Farrell (8–15) || – || 9,159 || 43–75
|- align="center" bgcolor="bbffbb"
| 120 || August 17 || Cubs || 3–2 || Kemmerer (2–2) || Anderson (2–6) || – || 6,539 || 44–75
|- align="center" bgcolor="bbffbb"
| 121 || August 18 || Cubs || 2–1 || Brunet (1–1) || Koonce (9–6) || – || 12,243 || 45–75
|- align="center" bgcolor="ffbbbb"
| 122 || August 18 || Cubs || 5–6 || Elston (4–7) || McMahon (3–4) || Cardwell (4) || 12,243 || 45–76
|- align="center" bgcolor="ffbbbb"
| 123 || August 19 || Cubs || 3–4 || Buhl (9–9) || Woodeshick (5–14) || Anderson (4) || 4,543 || 45–77
|- align="center" bgcolor="ffbbbb"
| 124 || August 20 || @ Phillies || 1–7 || Green (6–5) || Farrell (8–16) || – || 14,601 || 45–78
|- align="center" bgcolor="ffbbbb"
| 125 || August 21 || @ Phillies || 3–5 || Mahaffey (17–10) || Bruce (7–8) || – || 5,489 || 45–79
|- align="center" bgcolor="ffbbbb"
| 126 || August 21 || @ Phillies || 4–7 || Hamilton (7–11) || Golden (5–11) || – || 5,489 || 45–80
|- align="center" bgcolor="ffbbbb"
| 127 || August 22 || @ Pirates || 0–3 || Sturdivant (6–3) || Brunet (1–2) || – || 10,553 || 45–81
|- align="center" bgcolor="ffbbbb"
| 128 || August 23 || @ Pirates || 0–4 || Law (10–6) || Johnson (6–14) || – || 10,742 || 45–82
|- align="center" bgcolor="ffbbbb"
| 129 || August 24 || @ Reds || 2–4 || Purkey (20–4) || Woodeshick (5–15) || – || 18,879 || 45–83
|- align="center" bgcolor="ffbbbb"
| 130 || August 25 || @ Reds || 6–7 || Jay (20–10) || Farrell (8–17) || Brosnan (10) || 12,680 || 45–84
|- align="center" bgcolor="bbffbb"
| 131 || August 26 || @ Reds || 2–1 || Brunet (2–2) || Maloney (8–5) || – || 25,808 || 46–84
|- align="center" bgcolor="bbffbb"
| 132 || August 26 || @ Reds || 6–4 || McMahon (4–4) || Wills (0–2) || Umbricht (1) || 25,808 || 47–84
|- align="center" bgcolor="bbffbb"
| 133 || August 28 || @ Cardinals || 4–2 || Bruce (8–8) || Broglio (10–7) || McMahon (6)  || 9,510 || 48–84
|- align="center" bgcolor="bbffbb"
| 134 || August 29 || @ Cardinals || 3–2 || Farrell (9–17) || Gibson (15–10) || – || 8,295 || 49–84
|-

|- align="center" bgcolor="ffbbbb"
| 135 || September 1 || @ Cubs   || 3–4 || Ellsworth (8–17) || McMahon (4–5) || Schultz (3) || 9,887 || 49–85
|- align="center" bgcolor="bbffbb"
| 136 || September 2 || @ Cubs  || 3–1 || McMahon (5–5) || Buhl (10–10) || – || 13,088 || 50–85
|- align="center" bgcolor="ffbbbb"
| 137 || September 3 || Phillies || 2–3 || Mahaffey (18–11) || Farrell (9–18) || – || 17,302 || 50–86
|- align="center" bgcolor="ffbbbb"
| 138 || September 3 || Phillies || 3–5 || Hamilton (8–11) || Woodeshick (5–16) || Bennett (3) || 17,302 || 50–87
|- align="center" bgcolor="bbffbb"
| 139 || September 4 || Phillies || 4–1 || Bruce (9–8) || McLish (9–5) || – || 4,537 || 51–87
|- align="center" bgcolor="bbffbb"
| 140 || September 5 || Pirates || 5–3 || Umbricht (1–0) || Law (10–7) || McMahon (7) || 4,593 || 52–87
|- align="center" bgcolor="bbffbb"
| 141 || September 6 || Pirates || 4–3 || Kemmerer (3–2) || Face (8–7) || – || 5,196 || 53–87
|- align="center" bgcolor="bbffbb"
| 142 || September 7 || Pirates || 4–2 || Golden (6–11) || Jackson (8–18) || McMahon (8) || 6,208 || 54–87
|- align="center" bgcolor="bbffbb"
| 143 || September 8 || Mets || 4–3 || Kemmerer (4–2) || Anderson (3–17) || – || 1,638 || 55–87
|- align="center" bgcolor="bbffbb"
| 144 || September 8 || Mets || 6–5 (10) || Umbricht (2–0) || Craig (7–23) || – || 6,568 || 56–87
|- align="center"
| 145 || September 9 ||Mets || 7–7 (8) || – || – || – || 3,630 || 56–87
|- align="center" bgcolor="ffbbbb"
| 146 || September 12 || Dodgers || 0–1 || Roebuck (10–0) || Johnson (6–15) || Perranoski (19) || 28,669 || 56–88
|- align="center" bgcolor="ffbbbb"
| 147 || September 14 || @ Braves || 1–3 || Hendley (11–12) || Farrell (9–19) || – || 5,505 || 56–89
|- align="center" bgcolor="ffbbbb"
| 148 || September 15 || @ Braves || 8–9 || Nottebart (2–2) || Kemmerer (4–3) || – || 6,872 || 56–90
|- align="center" bgcolor="ffbbbb"
| 149 || September 16 || @ Braves || 4–5 || Burdette (10–9) || McMahon (5–6) || – || 5,477 || 56–91
|- align="center" bgcolor="bbffbb"
| 150 || September 18 || @ Mets || 6–2 || Johnson (7–15) || Jackson (8–19) || – || 3,670 || 57–91
|- align="center" bgcolor="bbffbb"
| 151 || September 18 || @ Mets || 8–6 || Drott (1–0) || Foss (0–1) || Umbricht (2) || 3,670 || 58–91
|- align="center" bgcolor="bbffbb"
| 152 || September 20 || @ Mets || 7–2 || Golden (7–11) || Hook (8–18) || Kemmerer (3) || 1,481 || 59–91
|- align="center" bgcolor="bbffbb"
| 153 || September 20 || @ Mets || 5–4 (12) || Kemmerer (5–3) || Daviault (1–5) || – || 1,481 || 60–91
|- align="center" bgcolor="ffbbbb"
| 154 || September 21 || Giants || 5–11 || Perry (3–1) || Brunet (2–3) || Miller (18) || 12,180 || 60–92
|- align="center" bgcolor="bbffbb"
| 155 || September 22 || Giants || 6–5 || Umbricht (3–0) || Miller (4–8) || – || 17,125 || 61–92
|- align="center" bgcolor="ffbbbb"
| 156 || September 23 || Giants || 3–10 || O'Dell (19–13) || Bruce (9–9) || – || 9,623 || 61–93
|- align="center" bgcolor="bbffbb"
| 157 || September 25 || @ Dodgers || 3–2 (10) || Farrell (10–19) || Roebuck (10–1) || – || 25,036 || 62–93
|- align="center" bgcolor="ffbbbb"
| 158 || September 26 || @ Dodgers || 1–13 || Podres (15–12) || Brunet (2–4) || L. Sherry (11) || 25,813 || 62–94
|- align="center" bgcolor="bbffbb"
| 159 || September 27 || @ Dodgers || 8–6 || Umbricht (4–0) || Perranoski (6–5) || – || 29,855 || 63–94
|- align="center" bgcolor="ffbbbb"
| 160 || September 29 || @ Giants || 5–11 || Sanford (24–7) || Johnson (7–16) || Miller (19) || 26,268 || 63–95
|- align="center" bgcolor="bbffbb"
| 161 || September 29 || @ Giants || 4–2 || Bruce (10–9) || Marichal (18–11) || – || 26,268 || 64–95
|- align="center" bgcolor="ffbbbb"
| 162 || September 30 || @ Giants || 1–2 || Miller (5–8) || Farrell (10–20) || – || 41,327 || 64–96
|-

Player stats

Batting

Starters by position 
Note: Pos = Position; G = Games played; AB = At bats; R = Runs scored; H = Hits; 2B = Doubles; 3B = Triples; Avg. = Batting average; HR = Home runs; RBI = Runs batted in; SB = Stolen basesPositional abbreviations: C = Catcher; 1B = First base; 2B = Second base; 3B = Third base; SS = Shortstop; LF = Left field; CF = Center field; RF = Right field

Other batters 
Note: G = Games played; AB = At bats; R = Runs scored; H = Hits; 2B = Doubles; 3B = Triples; Avg. = Batting average; HR = Home runs; RBI = Runs batted in; SB = Stolen bases

Pitching

Starting pitchers 
Note: G = Games pitched; GS = Games started; IP = Innings pitched; W = Wins; L = Losses; ERA = Earned run average; R = Runs allowed; ER = Earned runs allowed; BB = Walks allowed; K = Strikeouts

Other pitchers 
Note: G = Games pitched; GS = Games started; IP = Innings pitched; W = Wins; L = Losses; SV = Saves; ERA = Earned run average; R = Runs allowed; ER = Earned runs allowed; BB = Walks allowed; K = Strikeouts

Relief pitchers 
Note: G = Games pitched; IP = Innings pitched; W = Wins; L = Losses; SV = Saves; ERA = Earned run average; R = Runs allowed; ER = Earned runs allowed; BB = Walks allowed; K = Strikeouts

Farm system

1962 minor league affiliates

References

External links
1962 Houston Colt .45s season at Baseball Reference
1962 Houston Colt .45s season at retrosheet.org (Archived 2009-05-04)

Houston Astros seasons
Houston Colt .45s season
Inaugural Major League Baseball seasons by team
Houston Astro